This is a list of characters from the manga series Blade of the Immortal.

Main characters
  

The immortal referred to in the title. While not lazy, he is very laid-back, often seen sleeping. Manji also has a strange sense of "honour" that is in many ways similar to the fighting-ethic of the Itto-Ryu. The fallen samurai Manji served the Hatamoto Horii Shigenobu, a local daimyō, enforcing his brutal rule (unknowingly) on the local populace until he found out his lord was corrupt and killed him. For that he was considered an outlaw and hunted down by the same daimyō clan, achieving the nickname "Killer of 100" after the body count. He planned to flee to his sister's house even though she had married an officer of the law, Saitō Tatsumasa. Manji ended up killing his sister's husband out of self-defense when he attacked Manji. His sister witnessed her husband's death at the hands of her brother and went insane, reverting to a child-like mindset. Manji settled down to take care of her. At some point during this time, he met Yaobikuni (her name literally means "nun of eight hundred years"), a mysterious nun, who gave him the kessen-chu, or sacred bloodworms that made him immortal. Despite the obvious advantages of being nearly invincible, Manji dislikes being immortal. He tries to get Yaobikuni to remove the kessen-chu, finally making a deal with her. He has to kill 1000 bad men, to make up for the 100 good men he killed, if he does this, Yaobikuni will rid him of his immortality. It's worth noting, one reason he doesn't like being immortal is he feels it is making his swordsmanship rusty, because he doesn't have to be as good to win. After his sister is killed (due to a revenge for his actions) he met Rin, whom he accepted to help since he felt she was very much alike to his deceased sister. Manji is constantly trying to make amends for his past actions: he kills his lord to atone for those he killed on the Damiyo's orders; looked after his sister to atone for the deaths of the one hundred cops he killed; and makes the deal to kill one thousand bad men and to look after Rin to make amends for the death of his sister; he takes his role as her protector/surrogate older-brother seriously. However each time Manji tries to do something "good", he tends to only make the situation worse (the death of his lord leading to the deaths of one hundred cops, for example).

He uses many weapons, a good number of which came from defeated opponents. His two short, hooked swords are named Shidō (four paths). His two standard swords are named Imo-no-Kami Tatsumasa (Sister Defender Tatsumasa). His two chained scythes are called Mumei (nameless). His double bladed sword-breaker is named Kotengu (Little devil).  Most of his weapons are hidden under his shirt, a seemingly impossible feat given their large number, irregular shapes and lack of sheaths.  One of Manji's signature tricks is to make any of his hidden weapons drop out of his sleeves into one or both of his waiting hands whenever they are needed.

He first appears in Criminal.

  

The sole survivor of an Ittō-ryū massacre at Anotsu's hand and heir to her father's sword school, the "Mutenichi-ryū". She has mediocre swordsmanship skills but an intense desire to avenge the brutal death of her family. At the beginning of the series she is portrayed as somebody who is trying to act mature, but is still very childish - as the series progresses she steadily "grows up" and loses much of her naivety. She hires Manji as her bodyguard in this quest. However, it's not as simple as that - Rin is constantly torn by doubt over the righteousness and validity of her mission and fears becoming a hypocrite as Anotsu claims that she is more like the Ittō-ryū, especially when he remarks she chooses to use throwing knives instead of a sword like the "Mutenichi-ryū" teaches. She meets Anotsu at one point, but he claims that she is more like the Ittō-ryū as she continues her path for revenge. Anotsu's words is causing her to doubt.  When she finally encounters Anotsu in Kaga, she realizes she cannot defeat him and winds up traveling with him. If he starts to trust her, she might get the chance she wants to kill him. But Anotsu is no fool and is fully aware of what she is doing, despite this he allows her presence. She has since left his company, vowing that she will eventually kill him; yet she will stand back for the time being and watch how the events unfold. It is also worth noting that she kisses a sleeping Manji in the fourteenth volume, Last Blood, and has shown on numerous occasions that she develops feelings towards him.  They are as of now largely unreciprocated. She has three weapons, a Chinese sword named Kutoneshirika which she carries in a Toju (purse-like scabbard of sorts), a Tantō type dagger and a set of small throwing daggers named Ogunchu (Golden Wasps). Even though she is only mediocre in terms of fighting ability, Rin is still more skilled with weapons than most women of that time period and the fact that she carries a small arsenal of weapons with her makes her somewhat unique.  She first appears in Conquest part 1.

Ittō-ryū
  

 Leader of the Ittō-ryū and equal of Manji. While painted as the "villain" of the series at the start, he has had many scenes devoted to making the reader sympathetic to his views and goals.  An emotionally cold young man has prodigious skill with the sword, and leads the Ittō-ryū in order to form a dōjō dedicated not to form and rules, but to the simple test of superior lethality. Brought up by an abusive grandfather (a swordsman disgraced by the Asano dōjō), Anotsu is as pragmatic and shrewd as he is deadly. He isn't as inhuman as originally believed, as he even allows Rin to live after she attacks him; even letting her follow him everywhere. He is currently at "war" with Habaki Kagimura, the leader of the Banshu. Alongside Manji and Makie Otono-Tachibana, Anotsu confronts Habaki Kagimura and his Rokki-Dan in Nakaminato. He eventually slays Habaki in a tightly-contested duel, but is too exhausted to mount a challenge in the subsequent duel with Manji. Manji spares his life but Anotsu is fatally stabbed by Rin during his escape, although it's later hinted that he may have survived the attack. He has two weapons. The first, his main weapon, is a Nepalese-based axe named Kabutsuchi (Head Hammer). The other is his rarely used sword of the same name. First appears in Conquest part 1.

  

 Among the Ittō-ryū's finest swordsmen. Of peasant origin, he became a swordsman to avenge his sister, who was killed as a child by a samurai. Taito is one of the few swordsmen who has fought Manji and survived. He has also fought by Manji's side as well. He can be considered a kenshi, a swordsman who is not from the samurai class.  He despises the government by extension to his hatred of samurai and quits the Itto-ryu when Anotsu allies the group with Kagimura and the shogunate, though he remains on friendly terms with Anotsu.  When his lover of sorts, a prostitute named O-Ren, is killed by Shira, Magatsu ends up following Manji around due to the fact that he knows Shira is after Manji. Although they argue a lot, Manji and Taito have a relatively friendly relationship. In the end Manji allows Taito to find Shira, and despite how much Shira wants to kill Manji, he lets Taito get him. Eventually Shira loses the one hand he had left to Taito and presumably falls to his death.  Concerned by something Shira said, Taito decides to meet up with Anotsu and he eventually rejoins the Ittō-ryū.  Magatsu later joins Manji and Meguro to finally finish off Shira.  Taito's weapon is a gladius-like triple-sectioned sword named Grand Turk. The main blade is a gladius, the second is a smaller, shorter sword hidden in the handle, the last is a spear-head like dagger hidden within the pommel of the second blade. The sword is curiously missing a sword guard. First appears in Conquest part 1, first named in Fanatic part 1.

  

 Master swordswoman and in love with Anotsu.  Possibly the most skilled swordsfighter in the manga, she is said to be Anotsu's match and saved his life with her deadly abilities when they were children. Born into a samurai family, Makie and her mother  were disowned and cast away from the family by her father, when Makie's older brother committed seppuku after Makie was revealed to have inherited the family's famed talent and he was unable to defeat her in combat. She initially choose the path of the sword to avenge her mother's disgrace. She ended up becoming a geisha after Anotsu bought her freedom because she neither had the nerve to become a prostitute, like her mother, nor commit to becoming a swordfighter, lacking the nerve to kill when her concentration in battle is broken.  She defeats, but does not kill Manji, apparently turning her back on Anotsu. Later found living alone, having bound her hand in an attempt to destroy her own skill in combat after her father's humiliating death. She reappears in Last Blood, having followed Anotsu since he left Shirakawa when she realized his body was weakening, and destroys the nearly all men under Iriya who were pursuing Anotsu. After Iriya's death, she leaves with Anotsu and Magatsu.  She is later stricken with the same lung sickness her father died from while quietly residing with Anotsu and acting as his bodyguard.  When he departs from Edo during Habaki's last effort to destroy the Itto-ryu, Anotsu leaves her behind in order to spare her from fighting again.  However, she pursues him in spite of how her sickness is advancing until she encounters Habaki and the Rokki-dan, where upon she is reunited with Anotsu and Manji and fights alongside them.  As said by Anotsu, she is the only one that can beat him other than Manji, and even Habaki immediately recognizes and fears her skill. Makie is fatally wounded during an ambush by Hanabusa's forces, but manages to kill them all before dying. Her weapon, a double bladed three-section-staff, is named Haru-no-Okina (Old Man of Spring). She conceals her weapon in a hollowed-out shamisen, a mandolin-like instrument. She first appears in Dreamsong Part 1.

Other Ittō-ryū
  
 Second-in-command of the Ittō-ryū. An aged swordsman who nevertheless remains one of the Ittō-ryū's most skilled fighters. A skilled political operative, well suited to handling the dōjō's administrative tasks. He is missing his right arm, and uses a concealed dagger/machete-like weapon with a strange hilt. His missing right arm is actually replaced by three chains with weights which he uses as a weapon against Giichi. He is critically injured by Giichi after an intense battle during the Rokki-Dan pursuit. In the final chapters of the manga, Giichi stumbles upon Abayama, in a decrepit state, being treated by his granddaughter, making him one of the few survivors of the Ittō-ryū.

  

 Skilled pupil of Anotsu Saburō (Anotsu Kagehisa's grandfather) and master Ittō-ryū swordsman. Along with his skills with a sword, Kuroi has several quirks, which includes poetry referencing Black Sabbath appearing whenever he does. In addition, Kuroi is so obsessed with ageless beauty that he used taxidermy to preserve the heads of his former wife and Rin's mother, and mounted them on his shoulders. Along with his sword skills, Kuroi uses two shuriken referred to as Karasu, or "The Crow." He first appears in Conquest part 1 and is later killed by Manji in Conquest part 3. Kuroi Sabato's is inspired by the band Black Sabbath; Kuroi Sabato roughly translates into Black Sabbath from Japanese. Kuroi is a direct translation to the color black. Sabato when romanized, can be taken as "Sabbath." Black Sabbath is one of Hiroaki Samura's favorite bands.

  
 An Ittō-ryū swordsman living as a mask-maker. Determined to conceal his past from his son, Renzo, he is also the man who led the rape of Rin's mother. He first appears in On Silent Wings part 1, and is later killed by Manji in On Silent Wings part 6. Renzo then attacks Manji in rage, Manji feigning death. Renzo then makes an assumption his father had a sordid past with Rin at his father's burial, when Rin says, hypothetically, that there are some reasons past incidents shouldn't be brought up, as the blissful ignorance is better than the lifetime of shame. He appears in On Silent Wings (I-VI).

  

 Immortal swordsman usually dressed as a monk wearing a basket hat. Gifted with the same blood-worms as Manji, he seeks to gain Manji as an ally to overthrow Anotsu. He said in Cry of the Worm that the kessen-chu were given to him by Yaobikuni during the Muromachi period, which means he is two hundred years old. His weapons are a poisoned pair of a dagger and a saber both named Inoue Shinkai Kosatsu ("Wormkiller"). He first appears in Conquest part 1, is named in Cry of the Worm part 1 and is later killed by Manji in Cry of the Worm part 3. The poison he uses (Kessen Satsu) is later used in Trickster in an attempt to kill Manji.

 : Ittō-ryū fighter fascinated by Manji's immortality and determined to somehow steal it from him. His weapon is a Southeast Asian blade named Kamujin (Godblade). A very determined man, after losing both arms he still tries to kill Hyakurin by biting down on her throat. Beheaded by Shinriji as Higa was attempting to kill Hyakurin. He appears in Comrades (I-VI).
 : Cocky Ittō-ryū swordsman who detests the sun. Killed by Manji. He wields a pair of very narrow swords, one with a small hooked blade and the other with a straight small blade at the ends of the pommels, called Enchū-maru (Swallows of Death), which Samura notes would not allow Hanada to kill anyone unless he precisely strikes a lethal point. Samura stated he originally was supposed to resemble John Lennon but he ended up as "just another otaku dude". His glasses have a similar shape to those of Spider Jerusalem, one being round and the other quadratic. He appears in Comrades (I-IV).
 :Composed Ittō-ryū swordsman whose trademark is a chain ending in a barded spike, used for immobilizing his enemy, as well as his large machete-like weapon, Ondeko-bachi (Devil's Drumstick). Killed by Manji. He appears in Comrades (I-IV).
 : Ittō-ryū swordsman, who leads in the incident which results in capturing of Hyakurin and death of Shinriji. Killed by Giichi.
 : Enraged Ittō-ryū swordsman under Kinuka. Suffers from muscle deterioration brought about by one of Hyakurin's poisons, and thinks of nothing but his revenge on her. Killed by Hyakurin.
 : Ittō-ryū swordsman living as a doctor, charged with killing Shira and Manji. Mercilessly killed by Shira.
 : Ittō-ryū swordsman living as a herbalist. Charged with the duty of killing Shira and Manji. Suffers the same fate as Saikaya.
 : An Ittō-ryū swordsman, one of the ten core members of the group after several dojo leaders are slaughtered by Giichi and Kagimura Habaki. He has a star burst shaped scar over his left eye as a result of fighting a bear in his youth, an event which also permeates into his fighting style. He, Kasori, and Magatsu kidnap Rin in volume 15, Trickster, as bait to lure Manji in a trap. He fights using a sword which is designed to soak poisons and a dagger used to make his killing stroke. Is killed by Manji in combat.
 : Ittō-ryū swordsman, one of the ten core members of the group. He obtains kessen satsu from the deceased Eiku Shizuma's belongings to use against Manji. Is killed by Giichi in combat.
 
 A fiery tempered Ittō-ryū swordswoman who is quite small. Her primary weapon is an odd knife which is fashioned from a spearhead. She appears in the later chapters as one of Ittō-ryū's new recruits and greatly admires Anotsu. Doa always travels with her friend Isaku and the two have developed complementary fighting styles. This usually consists of Doa providing the offense with her speed and dagger, while Isaku provides the defense with his armored arms. Her tendency to jump right into battle with little to no provocation often lands her and Isaku in trouble. She ends up befriending Asano Rin.  She and Isaku are both originally from Hokkaido, where Doa was adopted and raised by Ainu, but was treated as an outsider by her contemporaries despite her devotion to the Ainu.  She previously went by the names "Kuichiru" and "Towa"; her current name, Yoshino, comes from a novel that Anotsu lent her so she would improve her literacy.

 
 An Ittō-ryū member of great height (over 1.90 meters/6'2" tall) and strength. Unlike most members of the Ittō-ryū, Isaku has no weapons to speak of, instead he wears various piece of armor and tends to act defensively. He is also Doa's best friend and the two always travel together. Isaku often finds himself rescuing Doa, apologizing for her and keeping her from killing others (usually by picking her up and running away). He and Doa have also developed complementary fighting styles, with Isaku acting as the defense and Doa as the offense. He ends up befriending Asano Rin. In reality, he is a Portuguese Christian and the son of a priest. He is not incredibly intelligent, but is kindhearted. Is cut in two as a result of the experiments in Habaki's compound, only to be reassembled by Doa - he briefly has similar regenerative abilities to Manji, which gradually wear off.

 
He is an elderly man with a long white beard and unknown to Habaki, Kashin has been making highly detailed maps of his castle as he performs medical services in Habaki's stronghold. These maps are later used to aid Rin and Doa as they infiltrate Habaki's castle to find and rescue Manji and Isaku. He is killed in battle by Ryo of Rokki-Dan.

 
 A masked member of the Ittō-ryū who appears to be deaf and communicates through the use of sign language and simple sounds.  He is one of the ten core members of the group.  He is known as "the guy no one wants to fight beside" because of his use of a hypnotic flute to fight. Ozuhan, himself, is immune to the effects of his instrument.  He is extremely agile and highly aware of his surroundings, allowing him to escape most traps; originally sent to Habaki's stronghold to aid Rin and Doa, he escapes from the same castle during Anotsu's raid and is separated from the group afterward.

 
 A powerful and skilled swordsman of the Ittō-ryū, he conducts espionage related activities and is one of the ten core members of the group.  He carries two katana that he wields effectively, but his trademark weapon is a third sword, a nodachi with holes along the entire blade that allow him to retain his remarkable speed.  Among his distinguishing features is a scar that runs across his nose, which results in Manji being mistaken for Sukezane during Habaki's final attempt to wipe out the Ittō-ryū. He sacrifices himself against shogunate guards so Anotsu and Magatsu can escape after their raid on Edo castle.

Mugai-ryū
  
The leader of the Shogun's Banshu samurai, the Bangashira, and his household included his wife Shima, son Sakutaro and daughter to a concubine, Ryo who dotes on him. He is secretly the leader of the Mugai-ryū and later the Rokki-Dan and becomes the main antagonist of the story. He simultaneously invites the Ittō-ryū to become an official sword school while directing the Mugai-ryū against it. Kagimura also masterminded and took part in the massacre that occurred during a feast welcoming the Ittō-ryū into the Banshu. Abayama's comments imply that he is incredibly skilled with a sword, which he proves by his attack on Manji in Trickster, volume 15, however, the battle costs him an eye and Manji escapes the secret prison in which he is held, resulting in Habaki's removal from office and orders for him to take his life.  However, he is given the opportunity to die with honour and is given one month, along with the control of the assassins of the Rokki-dan, to fully eradicate the Itto-ryu and its leader.  With nothing to lose, he ruthlessly pursues Anotsu before finally catching up to him, along with Manji, Rin, and Makie. He is blinded during his duel with Anotsu, which combined with Manji's untimely interference leads to a fatal error while anticipating Anotsu's final attack. He first appears in Dark Shadows part 1.

  
 A female assassin and a lieutenant in the Mugai-ryū. Hyakurin was the wife of an abusive samurai, Hayakawa Kakōsai Genkei, who was obsessed with trying to gain fame by training Matsuhiko, their sickly son, to become a strong swordsman. He killed Matsuhiko's unnamed twin sister shortly after her birth because he saw no worth in raising a girl and then killed Matsuhiko for failing to meet his expectations. She later kills her husband to avenge the death of her children and is then arrested and sentenced to death. Her case came to the attention of Kagimura who subsequently recruited her into Mugai-ryū. Hyakurin's most unusual physical trait is her blonde hair (concealed frequently under a wig), which she maintains by bleaching it with a strong chemical as a compulsive desire to remove bloodstains from it. While her skills with a sword are unremarkable, she has an extensive knowledge of poisons. This knowledge carries over into her choice of weaponry, a collapsible wrist mounted crossbow with poisoned bolts named Burafuma (Little Steps). The crossbow also possesses two blades such that when the weapon is collapsed, Hyakurin can use it to stab her opponents. After volume 11, Beasts, her skills are impeded after being tortured and having her arm smashed. She later becomes pregnant and ends up "retired" from the Mugai-ryū because of a deal between Habaki and Giichi when Giichi earns his freedom.  She has no desire to keep the child because she believes she will be reminded of Shinriji's death and the faces of the Ittō-ryū men who raped her.  She first appears in Dark Shadows part 1.

  
 A cold-blooded killer in the Mugai-ryū. He's responsible for the death of Magatsu Taito's close friend, O-Ren. Shira's a sadistic psychopath who derives sexual pleasure in the torture and murder of his victims, particularly young women. After an attempt to ambush Anotsu goes horribly wrong and he tries to take it out on his attackers. He uses the saw-blade side of his sword to hack of some of their limbs, and then tries to rape a prostitute that was with them while cutting her up at the same time. Rin tries to stop him but is slapped away, Manji arrives and manages to take off Shira's hand before he runs off. Following this incident he cuts some flesh from his injured arm, and sharpens the bones into spikes. His hair turns stark white due to the trauma he caused himself. He develops an obsession with revenge on Manji which leads to him betraying his Mugai-ryū comrades, causing the death of Shinriji and capture of Hyakurin. Later, his quest for revenge against Manji leads to a battle with Magatsu Taito, who was traveling with Manji specifically so he could find Shira. This battle further cripples him with the loss of his remaining hand. Recently he's been shown to be imprisoned in the same prison Manji is currently being held in, and has been set parameters/lists as to whom he shall face before being allowed to fight Manji (this list includes Magatsu). He also states that he has since lost one eye, and has a new "weapon" of sorts. No longer being able to feel pain, he steals Manji's missing left arm and attaches to his own, gaining bloodworms.  He is eventually killed by Manji after an intense battle due to overextending his immortality by getting cut up too much while his bloodworms were weakened by the winter cold and his body is left to be eaten by dogs. However, before he finally succumbs to the pack of dogs, he tells Renzo not to become pure evil like himself, not to listen to men like him anymore and to give up his pursuit of Manji's death; saying that Renzo isn't cut out for a life of vengeance. He uses a ninja-to sword, with a saw edge on one side of the blade. He usually uses the regular side to immobilize opponents by cutting off their legs, and then uses the saw-blade to cut off other parts of the body and cause maximum pain. This sword is named "Hotosogi" or woman shadow eraser. However, there is a second meaning for "Hotosogi" which also fits Shira's sadistic nature; when the kanji for woman and shadow are used together they become vagina. He first appears in Dark Shadows part 2 and is first named in Dark Shadows part 3.

  
 The strongest Mugai-ryū killer, aside from the immortality enhanced Shira. Though little is initially known about his past or reasons for being sentenced to death, it is eventually revealed that after Giichi's wife died, he devoted himself to raising their sickly son, Tojiro.  However, as a poor shipwright, the cost of doctors, medicine, and interest forced Giichi to resort to crime until he was caught and recruited by Habaki.  Giichi is one of the most skilled fighters in the series, having killed a total of 59 Ittō-ryū swordsmen on his own. Of the Mugai-ryū, he is the only member who manages to garner enough kills to earn his freedom; however, this achievement means little to him when he learns at the same time that Tojiro has suddenly died. He works closely with Kagimura Habaki and cares for the other Mugai-ryū, attempting to buy Hyakurin's freedom as well, unsuccessfully.  He disappears when Habaki dissolves the Mugai-ryū and is later found living in among the burakumin by Rin and Hyakurin, where he provides Rin with information concerning Manji's whereabouts.  Now a broken man, he deliberately distances himself from Hyakurin to keep her from suffering any more pain and is aware of her pregnancy - when she tries to kill her baby, he stops her and persuades her to carry the child to term and allow him to raise the baby after it is born. He eventually agrees to work briefly for Habaki once again against the Itto-ryu; he and Hyakurin attack Abayama Sosuke, with Giichi taking on Abayama himself in a bloody battle that ends with Giichi defeating Abayama at the cost of an ear. He uses a unique weapon which resembles an oversized bladed handcuff attached to a length of chain. The weapon, Kanetsura's Mito-no-Kami (Guardian of the Three Paths), was adapted from a thresher or similar farming implement, and allows him to sever or entangle limbs, necks and weapons from a distance. It is hard to block as the handcuff like action will wrap it around what it hits, but it is broken by Manji in Volume 14: Last Blood. Manji gave Giichi one of his own weapons, two curved blades attached by a chain, that Giichi now uses though he claims he is only borrowing it. Giichi's first appearance is in Dark Shadows part 1.

  
 A bumbling Mugai-ryū swordsman. He was apparently a pickpocket and thief prior to joining the Mugai-ryū. After attending a sword school, he worked for a silk merchant. Disgruntled by his low wages, he stole money from the merchant and left. Shinriji intentionally stole 1 ryo less than 10 ryo to avoid the death penalty. Unfortunately for him, they added the money he earned legitimately to the total. He worked most closely with Hyakurin and developed a crush on her, viewing her as a surrogate mother, her blonde hair reminding him of his foreign mother. While he's not highly skilled with a sword, he does have a firm grasp of dimensions as noted by Kinuka, and is implied by Kagimura to have much potential. He first appears in Dark Shadows part 1, and is later killed by Kinuka, but not before taking out four Ittō-ryū.  As he dies, he positions himself to point south-east (archaically called tatsumi) in order to tell Giichi that Hyakurin has been taken to the Tatsumi district of Edo.  As a sign of respect, Hyakurin cuts her hair and places the tied locks on his gravesite.

  
 A former male prostitute, Makoto was recruited to be the group's mole within the Ittō-ryū. During his time in the Ittō-ryū, he served as a page for the senior members often carrying letters and taking care of their weapons during meetings. He was a key player in the massacre which occurred during a feast meant to celebrate the official union of Ittō-ryū with Banshu, slipping poison into the Ittō-ryū's food. Makoto is later killed by Abayama.  He first appears in Dark Shadows part 1 and is later killed by Abayama in Pity.

Shingyoto-ryū
  Played by: Tsutomu Yamazaki
The Sensei of the Shingyoto-ryū dōjō in Kaga. A man with a philosophy similar to the Ittō-ryū, he offers Anotsu the dojo in exchange for marrying his foster child, Hisoka. Forced by the bakufu to betray Anotsu. Dead by his own hand.
 :  Foster daughter of Ibane Kensui, the granddaughter of Ibane Kenshu, Kensui's former master. Afflicted with a sickly body and near blindness as a side-effect of the medication she needs to stay alive, she is physically weak but a sensitive and perceptive individual. She marries Anotsu, but almost immediately after he is betrayed by the Shogunate and Kensui. She aids Anotsu in his escape from Kaga. Dead by her own hand.
 :  Student of Ibane Kensui and unrequited lover of Ibane Hisoka. Humiliated by Anotsu during a duel of his own design, and seeks vengeance for the deaths of Kensui and Hisoka. Killed by the wounded Anotsu in Last Blood.
 :  Senior student of Ibane Kensui who is largely shown in a humble manner. He does not hold the same feelings of contempt or anger for Anotsu that are principally shared by his fellow students. Presumably killed by Magatsu.

Immortality Experiment Officials
: After defying the edict of leaving Japan for seven years to learn about western medicine, Burando returned and was imprisoned by the Shogunate. After Mouzen's failure, Burando is assigned by Habaki to succeed at achieving immortality; though he does not do so within the time limit, Habaki allows Burando to continue since Burando has produced results. He zealously conducts experiments on Manji and other prisoners to replicate Manji's immortality with utmost understanding of the human anatomy. However, his obsession results in the brutal deaths of a large number of prisoners and he is driven mad by his obsession. After Rin rescues Manji, Burando escapes from the prison and repents as he slowly finds the families of the men he killed and hopes to aid them anonymously with his medical knowledge.
: An experienced doctor brought in alongside Burando Ayame by Habaki to conduct experiments on Manji to achieve immortality. Habaki gives each doctor a limited period of time to produce results, but Mouzen fails and is presumably executed for his failure.
:  A thief imprisoned by the Shogunate and chosen as an experimental subject by Ayame Burando. While it initially appears that Dewanosuke's body developed immortal traits, during Burando's frantic efforts to determine if Dewanosuke has become immortal, Dewanosuke is killed when Habaki runs a sword through his chest.
: A man involved with the immortality experiment. He is a skilled swordsman whose job is to cut off limbs of experiment subjects as directed by Burando.
:  A samurai who is a highly skilled swordsman, frequently directed by Burando to dismember Manji for experiments while Manji is sedated and incapacitated. When Rin breaks into the prison to save Manji, she and Doa are confronted by Asaemon in Manji's cell; Asaemon, in turn, is killed by Manji. His liver is later used by Manji as medicine for Makie's tuberculosis, despite her aversion to idea of consuming human liver.

Rokki-dan
 are a private army divided into six divisions and fall under Habaki Kagimura's direct command. They are the successors to the Mugai-ryu and also consist of criminals. Should they fail to destroy the Itto-ryu before Habaki's execution, they will be executed as well.

: A member of the Rokki-dan's Onihana division, armed with a halberd. He wears a mask. He is killed by Sukezane Baro, caught off-guard by the speed with which he can use his specially-lightened nodachi.
: Habaki's illegitimate daughter, whose mother  has already died.  She works as a woodcutter and is earnestly devoted to her father. Habaki's family appears to be unaware of her, while Ryo cares deeply for both Sakutaro and Shima, Habaki's son and wife respectively. Though Habaki arranges for her to become a ward of one of his allies, Ryo would rather die helping him by taking the vacant seat among the member of the Rokki-dan's Onihana division.  However, despite her regular training, her skills as a sword fighter are mediocre in comparison to the considerably more powerful combatants existing in the series, a fact she is aware of. After returning as the only survivor of a mission in which she kills Koji Kashin, Habaki releases her from the Rokki-dan. Desperate to follow her father, Magatsu finds her feverish and collapsed on the ground and reluctantly takes her with him as he attempts to catch up to Anotsu, during which Ryo makes the request for Magatsu to take her as a pupil. She later dies protecting her father from Hanabusa's gunners.
: A member of the Rokki-dan's Onihana division. He wields guns as a weapon, being an incredible marksman. Killed while on a mission with Ryo to kill a group of Itto-ryu.
: A member of the Rokki-dan's Onihana division. A large man with a scar on the top of his head making it look lopsided and wears his hair in a series of coils. Fighting with large wide blades that can crush as well as cut, and possessing a heavily armored body that limits his opponent's avenues of attack, he proves to be a formidable opponent and manages to sever Manji's body in half during their fight. Rin takes advantage of Arashino's pity and duplicituously makes it appear that Manji's body isn't recovering from damage and then sets Arashino's body on fire, allowing Manji gain the advantage to kill him.
: A member of the Rokki-dan's Onihana division, he uses a nunchaku-like weapon. Is skilled enough to survive fighting Makie, though he was forced to run when he is aware that continuing a battle with her will result in his death. He can extend his weapon and use a style of mid-range fighting called "Skyward Snake", a rapid technique which he claims to have not mastered but uses to put Makie on the defensive. Is killed by Makie in chapter 209 after the Rokki-dan fail to ambush her.
: A member of the Rokki-dan's Onihana division, a one-eyed man in western-style dress with a bandana who uses spear-like weapons.  He fears boats and won't board them unless absolutely necessary; after interrupting Makie's attack against Doma, they both retreat in fear. Is killed by Makie in chapter 209 after the Rokki-dan fail to ambush her. He is a foreigner to Japan, explaining why he was condemned as a criminal due to Japanese laws against foreigners entering Japan during the Edo period.
: A member of the Rokki-dan's Onihana division, a short man with an overbite who wears a hood.  He brutally tortures Abayama's son and other people with direct association to the remaining known members of the Itto-ryu to learn their whereabouts. He fights with an acid spraying spear. Is killed by Amon, minor member of the Itto-ryu.
: An attractive Kunoichi working for Kagimura as a member of the Rokki-dan. She is also a student of Master Sori, whom she is infatuated with, and becomes friends with Rin, who works as Sori's housekeeper. Her attempts to have him accept her affections are usually misconstrued and her artistic style and poor cooking ability do little to impress Sori, who appears to be oblivious.
: A Kunoichi of the Rokki-dan alongside Meguro. As a student of Master Sori, Tanpopo is considerably much more talented at art than Meguro. She and Meguro know Rin, who works as Sori's housekeeper after Sori's daughter Tatsu gets married.
: A trusted retainer of Habaki, who Habaki requested to take in Ryo as a ward after Habaki's execution. Out of loyalty to Habaki, he accompanies him and helps organize the Rokki-dan in their pursuit of the Itto-ryu. He, Doma, and Tarieshin combine their forces in attempt to kill Makie, but are hopelessly outmatched. His hands are severed after Doma and Tarieshin are killed and he begs Giichi to kill Makie when Giichi enters the fray. After Habaki is slain by Anotsu, he commits seppuku with Magatsu's help.

Other characters
  : As her name implies, she is an eight-hundred-year-old nun. She herself has the kessen-chu and has imparted these blood-worms to both Manji and Shizuma. Yaobikuni finds Rin Asano at the graveyard where Rin's father is buried. After hearing her story, Yaobikuni urges Rin to find the toughest, strongest yojimbo of all: Manji. Yaobikuni is short in stature and has spiral tattoos on her face. She first appears in Criminal.
 : Manji's younger sister, who married an official named Saitō Tatsumasa.  When Manji kills Tatsumasa in self-defence, Machi witnesses the act and is driven insane, regressing to a childlike mindset.  When she is killed by men seeking to take revenge against Manji, Manji sets out to redeem himself by killing 1000 evil men in exchange for removing his immortality.
  : An assassin fascinated by western apparel and practices. He poses as a Christian priest, collecting bounties on criminals who confess their sins with a flintlock pistol, marked with the word "Divina" on the barrel. Has the dubious honor of being Manji's first victim to appear in the graphic novel. His first appearance and death both occur in Criminal. His name is a homage to John Lydon's stage name while heading the British punk band Sex Pistols, Johnny Rotten ("Gyobutsu" roughly translates as rotten fish).
  : Leader of the world's baddest ronin gang, the Shinsengumi. After Manji killed his brother "Johnny", Hishiyasu sought revenge by kidnapping Manji's sister, Machi, to use her as bait. When Manji would not submit to a duel, and offered only to fight barehanded, Hishiyasu lets Machi go only to kill her immediately after. He has two pronged swords that have the word "ACID" on the tsuba. After the death of his sister, Manji is able to accept his fate and proceeds to kill the entire ronin gang, starting with Shido Hishiyasu. His first appearance and death both occur in Criminal. Like Johnny, he has his name based on a member of Sex Pistols, bassist Sid Vicious (being Shido's name an almost literal romanization).
 
 A high-ranking spy and ninja obsessed with art, driven into political intrigue in order to gain access to European art, which is contraband in that period. Master Sōri has a daughter named Tatsu and is a childhood friend of the Asano clan. Rin goes to him hoping he will be another sword against Ittō-ryū. He refuses to offer any help at first but is soon able to provide Rin with thirty ryō. He later assists Manji after he is injured, and informs him about who is behind the Mugai-ryū. Also hires Magatsu to watch over his daughter while he is away painting, and is later revealed that may have greater interest in Magatsu (to which Manji notes after his conversation with Magatsu in volume 12, Autumn Frost). He first appears in Genius part 1.
: Known also as Tatsubō; Sori's daughter, a practical young woman who does not appear to be aware of most of her father's activities beyond sword fighting and is a childhood friend of Rin. She ends up taking care of Manji after he is severely injured by the Itto-Ryu while attempting to obtain a tsuko tegata to enter Kaga and follow Rin. She appears to be capable of taking care of her family's house, since Magatsu, who was hired by Sori to protect Tatsu, leaves with Manji in search of Shira even though Sori is still off painting. By the time Rin and Manji return, Tatsu has apparently married a local merchant's son, while Rin winds up helping Sori out with household tasks.  She returns to her father's home after divorcing her husband because she had become fed up with how overbearing he was to her just as Rin and Manji are about to depart in search of Anotsu again.
 : Son of Itto-Ryu member Araya Kawakami. Rin befriends him, only to discover his father was the one responsible for raping and then killing her mother.  She and Manji orchestrate a scene where it appears that Manji murdered Araya in cold blood and then was killed by Renzo so Renzo would not seek revenge like Rin.  After being orphaned by Manji, he is now Shira's hand both literally and figuratively.
 : The strong willed, proud and loyal wife of Habaki and his young son. When Habaki is condemned by his successor Hanabusa after failing to capture the Itto-ryu and producing results for the immortality experiment, Shima and Sakutaro are arrested in order to secure Habaki's cooperation. When Ryo attempts to save them, Shima astutely realizes that Ryo is Habaki's illegitimate daughter. To atone for her husband's perceived failure, Shima deliberately kills both their son and herself before Hanabusa and Habaki to ensure that Habaki will no longer have any obstacles to destroy the Itto-ryu.  Their deaths have a devastating impact on Habaki who cares greatly for both of them.
: Previously subordinate to Habaki, Hanabusa becomes Habaki's successor when Habaki is forced to accept that he has failed to contain the Itto-ryu and produce successful results from the Immortality Experiment.  Though Hanabusa is cunning, his ability to scheme his way into ensuring Habaki's downfall by negotiating with the Itto-ryu fails largely due to Hanabusa's inability to match Habaki's ruthless determination and being unable to truly anticipate the movements of Anotsu and the Itto-ryu.

References

Blade of the Immortal